Singur Dam also written as  Singoor (సింగూర్ in Telugu) is an irrigation, hydroelectric and drinking water project located in Singooru village near Sangareddy district in Telangana, India. It is a major source of drinking water for Hyderabad city.

The dam is built on the river Manjira. The construction was completed in 1998. Singur reservoir has live storage capacity of 29 Tmcft

It is a popular tourist destination.

This pipeline scheme is an inter river basin transfer link by feeding Godavari River water to Krishna River basin for Hyderabad city drinking water and subsequent regeneration/sewage flows generated  (80%) for irrigation purpose. Nearly 10 tmcft water is supplied to Hyderabad city from this reservoir.

History
It has history of series of delays since its inception. The irrigation component of this dam in Medak district is not yet implemented. In October 1999, 1 of 17 radial spillway gates failed on the Singur Dam in Andhra Pradesh, India. This failure occurred during initial filling of the reservoir when the water level was
 below design level. The gate became dislodged due to a detachment of the left side trunnion girder. The right side arm supported the gate for 22 hours before becoming completely dislodged and washing away. The Andhra Pradesh State authorities attributed the failure of the gate to inadequate welding between the trunnion girder and the tie flats (Mande et al., 2000). There is no mention of downstream damage resulting from this failure.

See also
 Nizamsagar
 Sriram Sagar Project

References

Dams in Telangana
Medak district